Deroplatys is a genus of mantis in the family Deroplatyidae.  They are native to Asia and several share the common name of dead leaf mantis.

Species
The Mantodea Species File lists:

 Deroplatys angustata (Westwood, 1845)
 Deroplatys cordata (Fabricius, 1798)
 Deroplatys desiccata (Westwood, 1839) - type species 
 Deroplatys gorochovi (Anisyutkin, 1998)
 Deroplatys indica (Roy, 2007)
 Deroplatys lobata (Guérin-Méneville (1838)
 Deroplatys moultoni (Giglio-Tos, 1917)
 Deroplatys philippinica (Werner, 1922)
 Deroplatys rhombica (Brunner, 1897)
 Deroplatys sarawaca (Westwood, 1889)
 Deroplatys trigonodera (Westwood, 1889)
 Deroplatys truncata (Guerin-Meneville, 1843)

Captivity
There are 4 Deroplatys species that are kept and bred in captivity (as exotic pets) and they are:
Deroplatys lobata
Deroplatys desiccata
Deroplatys truncata
Deroplatys trigonodera

Additional images

See also
 List of mantis genera and species

References

 
Mantodea genera
Deroplatyinae
Mantodea of Asia
Mantodea of Southeast Asia
Taxa named by John O. Westwood